Dungannon Thomas Clarkes (in Irish 'Dún Geanainn Thomáis Uí Cleirigh') is a Gaelic Athletic Association club based in the town of Dungannon in County Tyrone, Northern Ireland. They play at O'Neill Park in Dungannon, which is also the second home of Tyrone G.A.A. 

The club has won 11 Senior Football Championships and 4 Intermediate Football Championships.

History
Dungannon Thomas Clarkes GFC (Cumann Thomáis Uí Chléirigh Dún Geanainn) was formed in 1917 and is named after one of the executed leaders of the 1916 Easter Rising, Thomas J Clarke, who spent his formative years living in Dungannon. The club colours are green, white and yellow. 

O'Neill Park has been the home of the Clarkes since 1947. It was the first GAA owned pitch in Tyrone and represented at the time a growing confidence in the GAA in its ability to develop and organise Gaelic games. A new pavilion was opened in 1967 and was destroyed in a bomb attack on the club in 1971. the existing clubrooms were completed in 1981 and replace the bombed building. The spectator stand was added to the club facilities on the site of the old clubrooms in the late 1980s. Recent development work has made further improvements to the ground which is still regarded by many as the best venue in Tyrone for atmosphere at a big game. 

A club whose sons such as Iggy Jones, Gerald Cavlan, Audi Hamilton, Danny Barr and Brendan Mallon have all won Ulster senior championship medals with Tyrone. Gerald Cavlan, Paul Donaghy and Oran Mallon are the only three players in the club's history to win the All Ireland Senior inter county football championship with Tyrone, Cavlan in 2003 whilst Donaghy and Mallon in 2021.

Achievements
 Tyrone Senior Football Championship (11)
 1909, 1925, 1929, 1933, 1935, 1936, 1944, 1947, 1951, 1956, 2020 
 Tyrone Intermediate Football Championship 
 1963, 1972, 2001, 2014

Notable players
 Gerard Cavlan
 Iggy Jones

References

Gaelic games clubs in County Tyrone
Gaelic football clubs in County Tyrone
Dungannon

Website
 Dungannon Thomas Clarkes GAA Website